Mark Lettieri (born c. 1984) is an American guitarist, composer and producer. He is a member of the jazz fusion band Snarky Puppy, funk band The Fearless Flyers, and also performs with his quartet, the Mark Lettieri Group. His background spans several genres including jazz, rock and funk. He has released seven solo albums. His 2021 album Deep: The Baritone Sessions Vol. 2 was nominated for a Grammy Award for Best Contemporary Instrumental Album.

Life and career

Lettieri was born and raised in the San Francisco Bay Area. At age 12 he began playing guitar. He names Jimi Hendrix and Joe Satriani as early influences for expanding his interest in the instrument. Along with guitar lessons (including jazz guitar), he learned by playing along with recorded music and emulating guitar parts, and playing gigs in various bands. He studied marketing at Texas Christian University in Fort Worth, Texas, and after graduating decided to pursue music professionally. He performed in the Dallas-Fort Worth music scene in clubs, recording sessions, backing bands, and in a variety of genres including R&B, gospel, Christian, country, blues, rock and funk. In regard to starting out as a musician, he said he needed to be versatile and be able to perform in any role and style.

In 2008 he started performing and recording with the jazz fusion band Snarky Puppy, at the time a Dallas-based band whose members along with Lettieri shared the common influence of the Dallas R&B music scene. He is a member of the ensemble and has received four Grammys with the band. He is a founding member of The Fearless Flyers, an instrumental quartet consisting of guitarist Cory Wong, bassist Joe Dart and drummer Nate Smith. Since 2018 the quartet has released three EPs, a studio album and a live album. He performs and tours with his quartet, the Mark Lettieri Group, consisting of bassist Wes Stephenson, keyboardist Daniel Porter, and drummer Jason "JT" Thomas. He has performed as a session and touring musician with Erykah Badu, David Crosby, Kirk Franklin, Ledisi, Dave Chappelle and others. In 2021, he collaborated with Apple Inc. to create a package of downloadable guitar loops for the digital audio workstations Logic Pro and GarageBand.

In 2011 Lettieri started releasing his solo works. He has released six solo albums, three of which have charted on the Billboard Jazz Albums Chart. Lettieri describes his style as textural and groove-based performance, with serving the song being first priority. His 2021 album Deep: The Baritone Sessions Vol. 2 was nominated for a Grammy award in the category Best Contemporary Instrumental Album. In 2021, the PRS Guitars company introduced the Mark Lettieri signature Fiore guitar which incorporates Lettieri's design preferences.

Equipment

Lettieri's primary instruments include his signature PRS Fiore, a Fender/Grosh hybrid Stratocaster, a Grosh NOS Retro, a PRS McCarty 594 and a Bacci Leonardo baritone guitar. His primary amplifiers are the Supro Statesman and  Kemper Profiler. He uses J. Rockett, MXR and TC Electronic pedals and Dunlop Nickel Wound strings. He also uses a variety of other instruments and accessories as needed.

Personal life

Lettieri lives in Fort Worth, Texas. He is married and has a daughter. In college he competed in track and field.

Discography

Solo albums
Knows (2011)  
Futurefun (2013)
Spark and Echo (2016)
Deep: The Baritone Sessions (2019)
Things of That Nature (2019)
Deep: The Baritone Sessions Vol. 2 (2021)
Fly Through It (2022)

with The Fearless Flyers 
The Fearless Flyers (2018)
The Fearless Flyers II (2019)
Tailwinds (2020)
Flyers Live at Madison Square Garden (2021)
The Fearless Flyers III (2022)

with Snarky Puppy
Bring Us the Bright (2008)
Tell Your Friends (2010)
GroundUP (2012)
Family Dinner – Volume 1 (2013)
We Like It Here (2014)
Sylva with Metropole Orkest (2015)
Family Dinner – Volume 2 (2016)
Culcha Vulcha (2016)
Immigrance (2019)
Live at the Royal Albert Hall (2020)
Empire Central (2022)

Session discography selected works

Notes

References

External links

Mark Lettieri interview, Total Guitar magazine, 2019

American funk guitarists
American jazz guitarists
American rhythm and blues musicians
American session musicians
American male guitarists
Songwriters from Texas
Guitarists from Texas
21st-century American guitarists
21st-century American male musicians
Musicians from California
American male songwriters
People from Fort Worth, Texas
1980s births
Living people
Texas Christian University alumni